"Toinen" is a Finnish-language song by Finnish pop singer Jenni Vartiainen, released in Finland on 3 December 2007 by Warner Music Group. The first promotional single from her debut album Ihmisten edessä, the song peaked at number 13 on the Finnish Singles Chart in early 2008. The song appeared also on the soundtrack album of the 2007 movie Sooloilua.

Track listing
Digital download

Charts

References

2007 songs
Jenni Vartiainen songs
Finnish-language songs
Songs written by Jukka Immonen
Warner Music Finland singles